This is a list of miscarriage of justice cases. This list includes cases where a convicted individual was later cleared of the crime and either has received an official exoneration, or a consensus exists that the individual was unjustly punished or where a conviction has been quashed and no retrial has taken place, so that the accused is legally assumed innocent. This list is not exhaustive. Crime descriptions with an asterisk indicate that the events were later determined not to be criminal acts.

List of cases

Argentina

Armenia

Australia

Brazil

Canada

China

Finland

France

Germany

Greece

Iceland

Iran

Ireland

Israel

Italy

Japan

Mexico

Netherlands

New Zealand

Nicaragua

Norway

Poland

Romania

South Africa

South Korea

Spain

Sweden

Switzerland

Taiwan

Uganda

United Kingdom

United States

Due to the high number of documented notable wrongful conviction entries for the United States, the list can be viewed via the main article.

Vietnam

See also

 Prosecutorial misconduct
 Exculpatory evidence
 Innocence Project
 Race in the United States criminal justice system
 Capital punishment in the United States
 Innocent prisoner's dilemma
 Miscarriage of justice
 False confession
 Overturned convictions in the United States
 Capital punishment debate in the United States
 List of exonerated death row inmates
 Wrongful execution
 Maurice Hastings

References

Notes

Further reading
 Jed S. Rakoff, "Jailed by Bad Science", The New York Review of Books, vol. LXVI, no. 20 (December 19, 2019), pp. 79–80, 85. According to Judge Rakoff (p. 85), "forensic techniques that in their origin were simply viewed as aids to police investigations have taken on an importance in the criminal justice system that they frequently cannot support. Their results are portrayed... as possessing a degree of validity and reliability that they simply do not have." Rakoff commends (p. 85) the U.S. National Academy of Sciences recommendation to "creat[e] an independent National Institute of Forensic Science to do the basic testing and promulgate the basic standards that would make forensic science much more genuinely scientific".

 
 
 
People wrongfully convicted of murder
People wrongfully convicted of rape